Nikola Srećković (born 26 April 1996) is a Serbian professional footballer who plays as a midfielder for Spartak Subotica.

Career
Born in Valjevo, Srećković win the Serbian youth league with Rad 2014–15, and was nominated for the best player of that competition. After that, he joined Voždovac in summer 2015. He made his SuperLiga debut in the 8th fixture of 2015–16, against Radnik Surdulica. On the last day of 2018 summer transfer window, Srećković signed a three-year-deal with Vojvodina. A year later, Srećković signed a three-year-deal with Spartak Subotica.

Career statistics

References

External links
 Nikola Srećković stats at utakmica.rs 
 

1996 births
Living people
Sportspeople from Valjevo
Association football midfielders
Serbian footballers
FK Voždovac players
FK Vojvodina players
Serbian SuperLiga players